Alfonso Jordan, also spelled Alfons Jordan or Alphonse Jourdain (1103–1148), was the Count of Tripoli (1105–09), Count of Rouergue (1109–48) and Count of Toulouse, Margrave of Provence and Duke of Narbonne (1112–48).

Life
Alfonso was the son of Raymond IV of Toulouse by his third wife, Elvira of Castile. He was born in the castle of Mont Pèlerin in Tripoli while his father was on the First Crusade. He was given the name "Jourdain" after being baptised in the Jordan River.
Alfonso's father died when he was two years old and he remained under the guardianship of his cousin, William Jordan, Count of Cerdagne, until he was five. He was then taken to Europe, where his half-brother Bertrand had given him the county of Rouergue. Upon Bertrand's death in 1112, Alfonso succeeded to the county of Toulouse and marquisate of Provence.

In 1114, Duke William IX of Aquitaine, who claimed Toulouse by right of his wife Philippa, daughter of Count William IV, invaded the county and conquered it. Alfonso recovered a part in 1119, but he was not in full control until 1123. When at last successful, he was excommunicated by Pope Callixtus II for having damaged the abbey of Saint-Gilles and assaulting the monks.

Alfonso next had to fight for his rights in Provence against Count Raymond Berengar III of Barcelona. Not until September 1125 did their war end in "peace and concord" (pax et concordia). At this stage, Alfonso was master of the regions lying between the Pyrenees and the Alps, the Auvergne and the sea. His ascendancy was, according to one commentator, an unmixed good to the country, for during a period of fourteen years art and industry flourished. 

In March 1126, Alfonso was at the court of Alfonso VII of León when he acceded to the throne. According to the Chronica Adefonsi imperatoris, Alfonso and Suero Vermúdez took the city of León from opposition magnates and handed it over to Alfonso VII. Among those who may have accompanied Alfonso on one of his many extended stays in Spain was the troubadour Marcabru.

By 1132, Alfonso was embroiled in a succession war over the county of Melgueil against Berenguer Ramon, Count of Provence. This brief conflict was resolved with Alfonso's defeat and Berenguer marrying Beatrice, heiress of Melgueil.

Alfonso seized the viscounty of Narbonne in 1134, and ruled it during the minority of the Viscountess Ermengarde, only restoring it to her in 1143. 
In 1141 King Louis VII pressed the claim of Philippa on behalf of his wife, Eleanor of Aquitaine, even besieging Toulouse, but without result. 
That same year Alfonso Jordan was again in Spain, making a pilgrimage to Saint James of Compostela, when he proposed a peace between the king of León and García VI of Navarre, which became the basis for subsequent negotiations.

In 1144, Alfonso again incurred the displeasure of the church by siding with the citizens of Montpellier against their lord. 
In 1145, Bernard of Clairvaux addressed a letter to him full of concern about a heretic named Henry in the diocese of Toulouse. Bernard even went there to preach against the heresy, an early expression of Catharism. A second time he was excommunicated; but in 1146 he took the cross (i.e., vowed to go on crusade) at a meeting in Vézelay called by Louis VII. In August 1147, he embarked for the near east on the Second Crusade.
He lingered on the way in Italy and probably in Constantinople, where he may have met the Emperor Manuel I.

Alfonso finally arrived at Acre in 1148. He died at Caesarea, which was followed by accusations of poisoning, levelled against either Eleanor of Aquitaine, wife of Louis VII of France, or Melisende, the mother of King Baldwin III of Jerusalem, who may have wanted to eliminate him as a rival to her brother-in-law Raymond II. 

Alfonso and Faydiva d'Uzès had: 

 Raymond, who succeeded him 
 Alphonse
 Faydiva (died 1154), married to Count Humbert III of Savoy 
 Agnes (died 1187) 
 Laurentia, who married Count Bernard III of Comminges

He also had an illegitimate son, Bertrand.

Notes

Sources

156

 
 

 
 

1103 births
1148 deaths
People temporarily excommunicated by the Catholic Church
Counts of Tripoli
Counts of Toulouse
Dukes of Narbonne
Margraves of Provence
Occitan nobility
House of Rouergue
Christians of the Second Crusade